LIY may refer to:

 Banda-Bambari language
 CNEC Lee I Yao Memorial Secondary School, a protestant high school in Hong Kong, China
 Lintong railway station, in Xi'an, China
 MidCoast Regional Airport at Wright Army Airfield, in Georgia, United States